Tlascala is a monotypic snout moth genus described by George Duryea Hulst in 1890. Its only species is Tlascala reductella, the Tlascala moth, described by Francis Walker in 1863. It is found in North America, where it has been recorded from Florida to Illinois and Kentucky, as well as in Ontario. It has also been recorded from Honduras.

The forewings are banded with various colors. The first band is brownish, then a black, whitish and finally a pale brownish-gray band. There are two black discal spots in the median area and the subterminal line is black. The terminal line consists of a series of black dashes. The hindwings are brownish gray. Adults have been recorded on wing from February to September, with most records from April to July.

References

Phycitinae
Monotypic moth genera
Moths of North America
Pyralidae genera
Taxa named by George Duryea Hulst